Five-pins (or fivepins, 5-pins and other spellings) may refer to:

Five-pin billiards, which may more specifically refer to:
Danish pin billiards
Italian five-pin billiards
Five-pin bowling